Columbia High School is a four-year public secondary school in Nampa, Idaho. The third major high school in the Nampa School District 131, Columbia opened in 2006, designed with two floors and a separate building for technology, agriculture, and shop classes. The school district shuttles students from one high school to the other to meet their class requirements. Each school has a different focus; Columbia's is technology, performing arts, and broadcasting.

Naming controversy
Before the school was built, the district had decided on the name Aurora High School. The name Aurora was based on the natural phenomenon aurora borealis. Following a letter-writing campaign by students of the middle schools feeding into the future high school, in which reference was made to the character Princess Aurora in the 1959 film Sleeping Beauty, the District altered its proposed name to Columbia High School after the Space Shuttle Columbia disaster. Students accepted this name and it is expected to be permanent.

Performing arts
Immediately after Columbia's establishment, its Performing Arts Department initiated several activities. All choirs in 2006 got a superior in the District Three Competition. The Drama Department has put on plays such as A Girl In The Mirror, Arsenic and Old Lace, and Snoopy, as well as musicals such as Grease and Hairspray. The High school marching band has won their division 8 times. Their shows include Latin Dances, Sound, Shape and Color, Second City Nights, Invincible, Signs, Relic, Persephone, Along Came a Spider, Mechanized, Light Prevails and Lost.

Athletics
Columbia competes in athletics in IHSAA Class 4A, the second highest classification, and are members of the Southern Idaho Conference (4A). Originally in Class 4A, Columbia moved up to 5A in the summer of 2014. Columbia moved back down to 4A in the summer of 2018.

In its first season in 2007, the baseball team won the 4A state championship.
The wrestling team won three consecutive 4A state championships (2009–11).
The Wildcats football team made the 4A state playoffs in the fall of 2011.

State titles
Boys
 Wrestling (3): (4A) 2009, 2010, 2011 
 Baseball (1): (4A) 2007  (records not kept by IHSAA)

Girls

Dance
2010 Champion with 1st in Prop

2011 1st in Hip Hop

2012 1st in Kick 1st in Hip Hop

2019 Runner up with 1st in Hip Hop

2020 not contested due to covid

2021 Champion with 1st Dance 1st Military 2nd Hip Hop 2nd Kick

2022 Runner up with 1st in Prop 2nd in Dance, 3rd in Military and 3rd in Hip Hop

2023 Champion with 1st in Hip Hop 1st in Kick, 1st in Military and 1 st in Dance

From Idhsaa.org

References

External links

Nampa School District #131 

Nampa, Idaho
Public high schools in Idaho
Schools in Canyon County, Idaho
Treasure Valley
2006 establishments in Idaho